Samantha Majendie-Albert (born 31 May 1971) is a Canadian-born equestrian who represents Jamaica in international competition. 

She was born in Montreal, Quebec, Canada to a Jamaican mother and an English father, and grew up in Canada and Jamaica. She moved to Bassett, England in 1989 where she currently resides.

Albert competed at the 2007 Pan Am Games and represented Jamaica in the 2008 Summer Olympic and 2012 Summer Olympic individual equestrian events.

Samantha was married to the fellow eventing rider Dag Albert, who represented Sweden at two Olympics. They have divorced in 2005.

References

External links 
Samantha Albert Official Site
Samanta Albert – Jamaica – Olympics 2008 – Yahoo! Eurosport UK

1971 births
Canadian emigrants to England
Canadian people of English descent
Canadian people of Jamaican descent
Equestrians at the 2008 Summer Olympics
Equestrians at the 2012 Summer Olympics
Living people
Olympic equestrians of Jamaica
Equestrians at the 2007 Pan American Games
Pan American Games competitors for Jamaica
Sportspeople from Montreal
Jamaican female equestrians
Jamaican expatriate sportspeople in England
Canadian expatriate sportspeople in England